Davis Creek may refer to:
Davis Creek, California, an unincorporated community
Davis Creek (Blackwater River), a stream in Missouri
Davis Creek (Salt River), a stream in Missouri
Davis Creek Township, Valley County, Nebraska, a township
Davis Creek, West Virginia, an unincorporated community
Davis Creek (Pend Oreille River), a stream in Washington
Davis Creek (Guyandotte River), a stream in West Virginia
Davis Creek (Kanawha River), a stream in West Virginia
Davis Creek (Lake Erie), a watershed administered by the Long Point Region Conservation Authority, that drains into Lake Erie